Nyakayojo is a mixed school in the city of Mbarara, Mbarara District. It is a public school, founded and owned by the Church of Uganda with support from the government of Uganda.

Location

History 
With the government policy to increase secondary schools during the second reign of president Apollo Milton Obote, in 1984, Nyakayojo church under the Church of Uganda, decided to establish a secondary school. 
The plans were led by Canon Yafesi Bikaaku. They established an ordinary senior school.
The school remained small with very few members until the coming of Late Kakuru Ephraim (Cadre) as he was popularly known to students, in 1989 he added many strategies, recruited more teachers and constructed more class rooms and students dormitories.

In 2001, advanced level was introduced specializing mainly in arts and mathematics. 
By 2005, when Kakuru Ephraim retired from the teaching service, the school had up to 500 students.

Tweheyo James, who is the chairman of Uganda National Teachers Union (UNATU) (2015), held the office as a head teacher of Nyakayojo Secondary School in 2005. Under him, the school developed strategically in the structures, students number, staff, sports, and academic performance.

It was in 2006 when the school took the Mbarara District Copa Coca-Cola schools football trophy for the first time and it won the trophy again in 2009 representing Mbarara District at the National level.

By 2009, the school was its peak with over 1400 students being one of the most populous schools in Western Uganda.

In 2010, Madam Angela Kabarungi took over as an interim head teacher and later in October the same year, Kakondo Simeon took over as a head teacher.

However the recent years have not been good for the school marked with various strikes, this reduced the reputation of the school, the number of students fall drastically to 490 students in 2014. However the school seems to be stabilizing in the year 2015 with an increase student to up to 800 students.

Reputation

The school is famous for sports in the whole of Western Region, Uganda. The school is also known for good performance. It has a female Mathematician Doctor 'Fulgensia Kamugisha Mbabazi'(@ Nyax from 1990 to 1993) currently working at the Department of Mathematics, Faculty of Science and Education, Busitema University, Tororo, Uganda.

Notable alumnus

 Ivan Koreta, a military officer in the Uganda People's Defence Forces. 
Fulgensia Kamugisha Mbabazi (Ph.D. - Mathematics)

See also
 Education in Uganda
 Mbarara

References

Boarding schools in Uganda
Mbarara
Educational institutions established in 1984
1984 establishments in Uganda